Danko Ljuština (born 24 February 1952) is a Croatian actor. He appeared in more than seventy films since 1977.

Selected filmography

References

External links 

1952 births
Living people
People from Karlovac
Croatian male film actors